German submarine U-88 was a Type VIIC U-boat of Nazi Germany's Kriegsmarine during World War II.

She was laid down at the Flender Werke in Lübeck as yard number 292, launched on 16 August 1941 and commissioned on 15 October with Kapitänleutnant Heino Bohmann in command.

She was a fairly successful boat, succeeding in sinking 12,304 GRT of Allied shipping in a career lasting just one year over three patrols.

Design
German Type VIIC submarines were preceded by the shorter Type VIIB submarines. U-88 had a displacement of  when at the surface and  while submerged. She had two shafts and two  propellers.

U-88 was fitted with five  torpedo tubes (four fitted at the bow and one at the stern), fourteen torpedoes, one  SK C/35 naval gun, 220 rounds, and a  C/30 anti-aircraft gun. The boat had a complement of between forty-four and sixty.

Service history

First patrol
Having moved from Kiel to Kirkenes in Norway in April 1942, U-88 departed for her first patrol on the 29th. She returned on 3 May.

Second patrol
The boat moved from Kirkenes to Narvik in early May and set-off for her second patrol on 17 June 1942. She sank two American ships, part of the ill-fated Convoy PQ 17, on 5 July. After a three-hour pursuit, the Carlton was hit by a torpedo which did not detonate. A second torpedo exploded on impact, the ship sank in ten minutes. U-88 then hit the Daniel Morgan which had already been attacked by German aircraft. Three men died, there were 51 survivors.

Third patrol and loss
U-88 left Narvik on 25 August 1942 for her final patrol. Forty-six men died; there were no survivors.

Alternate account of loss
U-88 was sunk on 14 September 1942 by depth charges from the British destroyer .

Wolfpacks
U-88 took part in three wolfpacks, namely:
 Strauchritter (29 April - 2 May 1942) 
 Eisteufel (21 June - 11 July 1942) 
 Trägertod (12 September 1942)

Summary of raiding history

See also
 Convoy PQ 17
 Convoy PQ 18

References

Bibliography

External links

German Type VIIC submarines
U-boats commissioned in 1941
U-boats sunk in 1942
U-boats sunk by depth charges
U-boats sunk by British warships
World War II submarines of Germany
World War II shipwrecks in the Arctic Ocean
1941 ships
Ships built in Lübeck
Ships lost with all hands
Maritime incidents in September 1942